The PDP Governors Forum or PDPGF is a political and policy think tank consisting of the state governors affiliated with the People's Democratic Party in Nigeria. The Forum was formed on 24 February 2013 when it split away from the Nigeria Governors Forum (NGF). The PDPGF aims to provide a platform for governors to interact and exchange knowledge, ideas and experiences about how to move the party forward as well as to better coordinate programmes and policies in their various states. The Forum is led by a Chairperson, currently Aminu Waziri Tambuwal. He took over in January 2020 from Seriake Dickson the previous chairman of the Forum.

List of current PDP governors
There are currently 13 PDP state governors:

List of PDPGF chairs
Since the organization's inception in 2013, the positions of chair and deputy chair have been chosen by the Forum members from among their number. The following is a list of current and former PDPGF chairs.

See also
National Working Committee
Rivers State People's Democratic Party

References

Governors Forum
Peoples Democratic Party state governors of Nigeria
2013 establishments in Nigeria
State governors of Nigeria
Political organizations based in Nigeria
Organizations established in 2013